FIS Snowboarding Junior World Championships are the Junior World Championships in snowboarding organized by the International Ski Federation (FIS).

Hosts

Men's events

Giant slalom

Parallel giant slalom

Parallel slalom

Halfpipe

Snowboard cross

Big air

Slopestyle

Women's events

Giant slalom

Parallel giant slalom

Parallel slalom

Halfpipe

Snowboard cross

Big air

Slopestyle

Mixed

Parallel team

Snowboard cross team

See also
 FIS Snowboard World Championships
 FIS Freestyle Junior World Ski Championships

References

External links
International Ski Federation - Calendar & Results

Snowboard
World youth sports competitions
Snowboarding competitions
Snowboarding Junior